Samuel Scott Alden (1907 – December 12, 1977) was an American special assistant to Federal Bureau of Investigation (FBI) Director J. Edgar Hoover, FBI special agent, director of the Tennessee Alcoholic Beverage Commission, lawyer, college professor, and a college sports coach. He was also a direct descendant of John Alden, a pilgrim who came to the United States on the Mayflower.  Alden studied at the University of Tennessee where he played for coach Robert Neyland on their 1927 football team, but did not graduate from there. He instead enrolled in and graduated from Peabody College, then chose to pursue a law degree from Vanderbilt University Law School.

Alden spent 27 years in the FBI, he was either a special agent or a special agent in charge of offices in Miami, Savannah, Knoxville, Dallas, Little Rock, and Baltimore. When he was in charge of the Knoxville office he was appointed as the first director of the state's Alcoholic Beverage Commission, a position he held for nine years (1963–1972).

In addition to Alden's government life, he served as the head coach for the football, basketball, and baseball teams at Austin Peay State University. He was one of the first coaches in all three sports at the school and finished with career head coaching records of 9–8–5 (football), 24–17 (basketball), and 6–7 (baseball). While at Austin Peay, Alden was also a professor of history.

Head coaching record

Football

Basketball

Baseball

References

1907 births
1977 deaths
Baseball coaches from Tennessee
Basketball coaches from Tennessee
American football guards
Austin Peay Governors baseball coaches
Austin Peay Governors men's basketball coaches
Austin Peay Governors football coaches
Austin Peay State University faculty
Federal Bureau of Investigation agents
Peabody College alumni
Players of American football from Tennessee
Sportspeople from Nashville, Tennessee
Tennessee lawyers
Tennessee Volunteers football players
Vanderbilt University Law School alumni
20th-century American lawyers